Greenock Royal Infirmary was a health facility in Greenock, Scotland. Its original Hospital or Infirmary of 1809 stood in Inverkip Street, it was subsequently extended round into East Shaw Street, then in 1869 a new building on the adjacent site at 2 Duncan Street formed the main address of the Hospital and Infirmary. It was renamed the Greenock Royal Infirmary in 1922.

History
The facility had its origins in a dispensary for the sick poor which was established in 1801 in the town centre near the harbour, initially in Manse Lane, then nearby in Cathcart Street. This provided medicines, and a surgeon made daily visits to the poor when they were sick at home. In 1806 a contagious fever spread from the crew of a Russian prize ship in the harbour, causing many deaths, and one of the surgeons proposed a new hospital or fever-house, "where the poor would be removed from their own uncomfortable dwellings, not only for their own sakes, but for the purpose of checking infection."

In 1807, funds were raised to build a Hospital or Infirmary, and a site obtained on the south edge of the town, up on the east side of Inverkip Street between the Anti-Burgher Secession Church of 1803 (called the Canister Kirk for its shape) and the 1789 cemetery. The building on Inverkip Street was designed by the local harbour engineer, John Aird, the foundation stone was laid in 1808, and the first patient was admitted in June 1809. The building was erected at an expense of £1815, on a site of land given by Sir John Shaw Stewart. 

The infirmary was extended with wings added in 1830 after another fever epidemic, and an 1847 extension incorporating the site and parts of the Canister Kirk continued the hospital round into East Shaw Street. A new Hospital and Infirmary building designed by Salmon and Son was added on the adjacent site at 2 Duncan Street in 1869. It was renamed the Greenock Royal Infirmary in 1922 and joined the National Health Service in 1948.

After services transferred to the Inverclyde Royal Hospital, the Greenock Royal Infirmary closed in 1979 and was subsequently demolished. The site was then used for a Sheltered housing complex providing 34 flats (for seniors) with associated facilities, built in 1988, which is named John Galt House in commemoration of the novelist and entrepreneur John Galt who was buried in the adjacent Inverkip Street Cemetery in 1839.

References

Hospitals in Inverclyde
Hospitals established in 1801
1801 establishments in Scotland
Defunct hospitals in Scotland
Buildings and structures in Greenock